Ercolania kencolesi  is a species of sacoglossan sea slug, a shell-less marine opisthobranch gastropod mollusk in the family Limapontiidae.

This sea slug lives on the alga Boergesenia forbesii and also within its tubes. It also feed on this alga.

References

Limapontiidae